The Capital Theatre is a 480-seat theatre in Bendigo, Victoria, Australia. Designed by prolific Bendigo architects William Vahland and Robert Getzschmann, the building opened in 1873 as a Masonic lodge, and was divided into a private and public section, the latter containing a ballroom where an array of entertainment was provided, including opera, plays, lectures, recitals and, later, silent movie screenings. In 1890, the Masons refurbished the building to include a dedicated theatre room. Originally called the Mason Theatre, it was renamed the New Britannia in 1912 and then the Capital Theatre in the 1930s. Today the whole building is occupied by the Capital, and has state and national heritage listing.

References

External links

The Capital 

Buildings and structures in Bendigo
Victorian Heritage Register Loddon Mallee (region)
Theatres completed in 1873
1873 establishments in Australia
Bendigo